The Slave's Cause: A History of Abolition is a history book by Manisha Sinha that was released in February 2016 by Yale University Press.

Writing in The Atlantic, Adam Rothman calls The Slave's Cause "a stunning new history of abolitionism."

References

Abolitionism in the United States
Political movements
African diaspora history
Slavery in the United States
2016 non-fiction books
Yale University Press books